Diwan Bahadur is a 1943 Indian, Tamil language film directed by T. R. Sundaram. The film featured T. R. Ramachandran and J. Susheela in the lead roles.

Plot
The story is about an illiterate rich man, played by Kali N. Rathnam, who was honoured with the title Dewan Bahadur by the British colonial government in India. T. R. Ramachandran is a critic of such people. He addresses meetings in English against such people being honoured.

Cast
The list is adapted from the film. (See External links)

Male cast
T. R. Ramachandran
K. K. Perumal
Kali N. Rathnam
E. R. Sahadevan
M. E. Madhavan
V. N. Kumaraswamy
V. M. Ezhumalai - (not credited in titles)

Female cast
J. Susheela
P. S. Sivabhakyam
T. N. Rajalakshmi
C. T. Rajakantham
P. R. Mangalam
P. S. Gnanam

Production
The film was produced by Modern Theatres owner T. R. Sundaram who also directed the film. M. Haridass wrote the story, screenplay and dialogues. W. R. Subba Rao handled the cinematography while D. Dorairaj edited the film. Audiography was done by R. G. Pillay. Settings and design were done by A. J. Dominic and P. B. Krishnan. The film was shot at Modern Theatres studios and processing was done by B. V. Modak. Lyrics were penned by S. Velsamy. There is no mention of any music composer in the film titles.

T. R. Ramachandran never learnt English language. But his diction, pronunciation and the accent were perfect. T. R. Sundaram, who was educated in England, was surprised at T. R. Ramachandran's spoken English. He appreciated the actor's performance and rewarded him with a handsome bonus.

Soundtrack
T. A. Kalyanam composed the music. K. V. Mahadevan worked as an assistant to him.

Yennai Kandathum - V. M. Ezhumalai
Aatrale Arive Mika Uyarvaam - C. T. Rajakantham

References

External links

Indian drama films
Films set in the 1940s
Films directed by T. R. Sundaram
1943 drama films
1943 films
Indian black-and-white films
Films scored by T. A. Kalyanam